Işık is a village in the central district of Hakkâri Province in Turkey. The village is populated by Kurds of the Ertoşî tribe and had a population of 445 in 2022.

The hamlets of Tepecik and Yapraklı are attached to Işık.

Population 
Population history from 2000 to 2022:

References 

Villages in Hakkâri District
Kurdish settlements in Hakkâri Province